The men's road race at the 1981 UCI Road World Championships was the 48th edition of the event. The race took place on Sunday 30 August 1981 in Prague, Czechoslovakia. The race was won by Freddy Maertens of Belgium.

Final classification

References

Men's Road Race
UCI Road World Championships – Men's road race
1981 Super Prestige Pernod